Richard Delano Campbell (born December 21, 1958) is a former National Football League (NFL) quarterback who played for the Green Bay Packers (1981–1984) after starring at the University of California in Berkeley. Campbell was a highly touted recruit out of Santa Teresa High School in San Jose, California and was Cal’s starting quarterback for his sophomore through senior seasons, 1978-1980. He earned the highly-valued Joe Roth Award as a sophomore in 1978. Roth, who had helped recruit Campbell to Cal, was a quarterback for the Golden Bears in 1975 and 1976. Roth died of cancer in February 1977 just weeks after completing his 1976 season, and the annual award bearing his name goes to the Cal player who best exemplifies Roth's courage, sportsmanship and attitude.

Campbell led a very competitive Bears team his junior year in 1979, winning 7 games and losing several very close games: 14-10 against #11 Michigan,  28-27 at UCLA,  24-14 to #3 USC (undefeated and eventual Rose Bowl winner), and 28-24 to #16 Washington. In discussing game film of Michigan's 14-10 win over Cal, coach Bo Schembechler referred to Campbell as "a big, strong, powerful quarterback" who "can pick you to death with his throwing arm" as he almost pulled off the upset  A fumbled kickoff return by Cal gave Michigan the ball at the 9-yard line, setting up a two play touchdown drive. The Bears did win the rivalry Big Game at Stanford 21-14 in November, one of his fondest memories from his days as the Golden Bears' QB: "Just walking off the field and hearing one side of the stands so silent". Campbell lifts the Axe, the rivalry trophy for the winner, after Cal defeats Stanford, November 17, 1979. Here is a short video summary of the "nail-biter" Cal-Stanford games of 1979 and 1980, Campbell's junior and senior years, and both Cal wins. Watch the entire 1979 Cal-Stanford game here.  

Campbell’s success his junior year led to his being featured on the cover of Street and Smith’s Official Yearbook 1980 College Football Preview. Stats for 1979 show Campbell was 3rd in the nation in passing yards, 2nd in completions, 2nd in completion %, and Cal was 3rd in Team Passing Offense.  “Though this season's 1980 Cal Bears will be 75% freshman and sophomores, not the best mix to contend for a championship ... they probably will again go as far as quarterback Rich Campbell’s brilliant right arm can carry them. He completed 67% of his passes (241 of 360 for 2859 yards and 15 TDs) last season as a junior, despite throwing into an 8-man coverage most of the time.  Breakdowns in the kicking game accounted for all five of the Bears 1979 regular season losses” 

He was an All-American his senior season in 1980, completing an NCAA best 71% of his passes. He set a then-NCAA record with 43 completed passes in 53 attempts in a losing effort against the Florida Gators. However his senior year was hampered by a late-season knee injury in the game at USC. During his college career at Cal, he passed for 7174 yards, a record at the time. He is still fourth all time in both passing yards and completions at Cal, as well as 12th in touchdown passes. Among the greatest quarterbacks ever at Cal, he is the most accurate passer in Cal history, as well as in the top five in both yards per attempt at 7.7 and passing efficiency rating (min. 300 attempts) at 132.7.

Campbell was a part of one of the strangest incidents at Cal’s Memorial Stadium that didn't involve the Stanford band ("The Play" happened three seasons later). After a punt in the 3rd quarter of the USC game in 1979, a hang glider decided to land on the stadium grass. The glider's path had him heading straight for the 6-foot-5 quarterback who was coming onto the field. "The crowd was buzzing and that caused me to turn around. He was about 5 feet off the ground and coming in fast. I kept getting lower and lower until I had to drop to all fours," Campbell recalled. "If I hadn't, he'd have clipped my head off." Shown are the ticket stub from that day, the Annual Joe Roth Memorial game, against #3 USC  and the game program with Campbell from the earlier #11 Michigan game, Sept 29, 1979.

Selected by the Green Bay Packers in the 1st round (6th overall) of the 1981 NFL Draft, and the only 1st round quarterback chosen, Campbell eventually played in only seven games over four NFL seasons. Packers offensive coordinator Bob Schnelker thought Campbell didn't have the arm strength, so he rarely put him in to play. Campbell recalls offensive coordinator Schnelker (a former tight end - not a quarterback) as “a really good X’s and O’s guy but not a guy that will work with you after practice and encourage and develop you. That was what I needed at that time and I didn’t get it.” Campbell led the Packers to a last minute road win over the Chicago Bears near the end of the 1984 season; that Bears team would make it to the NFC Championship game, and the Bears defense would dominate the entire NFL the next year, winning  the Super Bowl. Trailing by a point with 1:53 to go, Campbell moved the Packers 71 yards, capping the drive with a 43-yard TD pass to Phillip Epps with 34 seconds to go. The Packers won 20-14, avenging an earlier 9-7 loss to Chicago in September. After that 1984 season, the Packers traded Campbell to the Los Angeles Raiders, but he never played again. He has since become a newspaper columnist at Scripps Treasure Coast Newspapers.

The Packers did not draft another quarterback in the first round until 2005, when Aaron Rodgers, also from the University of California and who broke some of Campbell’s team records, became a Packer.

References

1958 births
Living people
American football quarterbacks
California Golden Bears football players
Green Bay Packers players
Los Angeles Raiders players
Players of American football from Miami
Players of American football from San Jose, California
Santa Teresa High School alumni